Ruby Sahota  (born June 22) is a Canadian Liberal politician who was elected as a Member of Parliament in the House of Commons of Canada to represent the federal riding Brampton North during the 2015 Canadian federal election.

Early life and education
Sahota was born in Toronto after her parents arrived in Canada in the late 1970s, and was raised in Brampton. Her father previously was the Chairman of the Ontario Sikhs and Gurdwara Council.

Sahota attended the Brampton's Central Peel Secondary School from 1993 to 1998, and then graduated with an Honours bachelor's degree in Political Science and Peace Studies at McMaster University in 2003. She then attended Western Michigan University Cooley Law School, graduating in 2007.

Legal career
From 2007 to 2012, Sahota practiced law in Cleveland, Ohio, focusing on commercial litigation. She became a lawyer after.

Political career
Sahota sought the Liberal nomination for the newly created riding of Brampton North, winning it on March 1, 2015.

The general election campaign involved some controversy, as Sahota's campaign criticized leaflets circulated by her opponent, Conservative incumbent Parm Gill, which it was alleged were deliberately aimed at confusing Sahota with previous Liberal Party MP Ruby Dhalla.  Sahota defeated Gill to win the election.

Once elected, Sahota was appointed to both the Standing Committee on the Status of Women and the Standing Committee on Procedure and House Affairs. She was subsequently named to the Special Committee on Electoral Reform. On February 1, 2017, she was elected Chair of the Federal Liberal Ontario Caucus by her peers. As Caucus Chair, she presides over meetings, lead discussion and act as an important link between Ontario Liberal MPs and the Prime Minister's Office and Cabinet.

Personal life
She is married to podiatrist Dr. Tejinder Sahota and has a son named Nihal.

Electoral record

References

External links

 Official Twitter Account
 Official Website

Liberal Party of Canada MPs
Living people
Members of the House of Commons of Canada from Ontario
Women members of the House of Commons of Canada
Canadian Sikhs
Politicians from Brampton
Politicians from Toronto
Canadian politicians of Indian descent
Punjabi women
Western Michigan University Cooley Law School alumni
McMaster University alumni
Canadian women lawyers
Lawyers in Ontario
Women in Ontario politics
21st-century Canadian politicians
21st-century Canadian women politicians
Year of birth missing (living people)